Manaku of Guler or Manaku (c. 1700–1760) was an Indian painter from the Guler State, in modern-day Himachal Pradesh. After his death he was mostly forgotten and overshadowed by his much-celebrated younger brother Nainsukh. But today he is recognised as an exponent of Pahari style of painting, much like his brother. The rediscovery of Manaku has been a result of research efforts by art historians like B. N. Goswamy. 
Like Nainsukh, Manaku almost never signed his works, and only four extant works carry his signature.

Gallery

Bibliography

References

External links
Metropolitan Museum of Art - Manaku collection

Indian male painters
1700 births
1760 deaths
Court painters
Year of birth uncertain
18th-century Indian painters
People from Kangra district
Painters from Himachal Pradesh